Adolph Charles "Dutch" Hoefer (September 16, 1921 – June 12, 1983) was a professional basketball player. He was a point guard, and spent two seasons in the Basketball Association of America (BAA), starting as a member of the Toronto Huskies in 1946 before being traded to the Boston Celtics on January 2, 1947 for Red Wallace. He attended Queens College and spent most of his professional career in the American Basketball League, mainly with the Wilmington Bombers. Hoefer served in the United States Coast Guard during World War II. He died in June 1983 at the age of 61.

BAA career statistics

Regular season

References

External links

1921 births
1983 deaths
American Basketball League (1925–1955) players
American expatriate basketball people in Canada
American men's basketball players
Boston Celtics players
Point guards
Queens Knights men's basketball players
Toronto Huskies players
United States Coast Guard personnel of World War II